Jim Cook (born 16 February 1948) was a Scottish footballer who played for Hearts, Kilmarnock, Dumbarton and Falkirk.

References

1948 births
Scottish footballers
Dumbarton F.C. players
Falkirk F.C. players
Scottish Football League players
Living people
Association football forwards